The 2006 Ole Miss Rebels football team represented the University of Mississippi during the 2006 NCAA Division I FBS football season.

Schedule

Roster

Game summaries

Memphis

Missouri

Kentucky

Wake Forest

Georgia

Vanderbilt

Alabama

Arkansas

Auburn

Northwestern State

LSU

Mississippi State

References

Ole Miss
Ole Miss Rebels football seasons
Ole Miss Rebels football